Trochulus caelatus is a species of small, air-breathing land snail, a terrestrial pulmonate gastropod mollusk in the family Hygromiidae, the hairy snails and their allies.

Distribution 
This species is endemic to the northwestern Jura Mountains, Switzerland.

Description

References

External links 
 Trochulus caelatus at AnimalBase

Hygromiidae
Endemic fauna of Switzerland
Gastropods described in 1820
Taxonomy articles created by Polbot